Jonathan Perry (born 22 November 1976) is a former New Zealand soccer player who played as a defender.

Playing career 
Perry played for the New Zealand national soccer team, the All Whites, collecting 28 caps (2 goals) in official FIFA internationals. He played his last game for New Zealand against Solomon Islands in July 2002.

References

External links 

1976 births
Living people
New Zealand association footballers
Barnsley F.C. players
Auckland City FC players
Waitakere United players
New Zealand international footballers
Sportspeople from Hamilton, New Zealand
Football Kingz F.C. players
Association football defenders
New Zealand Football Championship players
1998 OFC Nations Cup players
1999 FIFA Confederations Cup players
2000 OFC Nations Cup players
2002 OFC Nations Cup players